Justina Chepchirchir (born 20 October 1968) is a former Kenyan middle distance runner who specialised in 800 meters, 1500 metres, and 3000 meters events. She won gold medals in the 1982 African Championships in Athletics in 1500 m and 3000 m. In the 1984 edition she retained her title in 1500 metres and won another gold in 800 meters. She also competed for Kenya in the 1984 Summer Olympics in 1500 metres, but did not progress to the finals.

Achievements

References

External links

1968 births
Living people
Olympic athletes of Kenya
Athletes (track and field) at the 1984 Summer Olympics
Commonwealth Games competitors for Kenya
Athletes (track and field) at the 1982 Commonwealth Games
Kenyan female middle-distance runners